The Greater Hickory Kia Classic at Rock Barn was a golf tournament on the Champions Tour. It was played annually in June in Conover, North Carolina at the Rock Barn Golf & Spa.

The purse for the 2014 tournament was US$1,600,000, with $240,000 going to the winner, Jay Haas. The tournament was founded in 2003.

Winners
Greater Hickory Kia Classic at Rock Barn
2014 Jay Haas
2013 Michael Allen

Greater Hickory Classic at Rock Barn
2012 Fred Funk
2011 Mark Wiebe

Ensure Classic at Rock Barn
2010 Gary Hallberg

Greater Hickory Classic at Rock Barn
2009 Jay Haas
2008 R. W. Eaks
2007 R. W. Eaks
2006 Andy Bean
2005 Jay Haas
2004 Doug Tewell
2003 Craig Stadler

References

External links

Coverage on the Champions Tour's official site

Former PGA Tour Champions events
Golf in North Carolina
Tourist attractions in Catawba County, North Carolina
Recurring sporting events established in 2003
Recurring sporting events disestablished in 2014